White Coomb is a hill in the Moffat Hills range, part of the Southern Uplands of Scotland. Its broad summit is the highest point in the range and the registration county of Dumfriesshire, as well as being the fourth highest point in southern Scotland, however, despite this, it is largely concealed by other hills on all sides except its east and south east, making this the only direction from which its full scale can be seen.

White Coomb is most easily climbed from the National Trust for Scotland car park underneath the Grey Mare's Tail waterfall, on the A708 from Moffat to Selkirk, at NT 186146. The most direct route heads directly west up a steep ridge, but a more comfortable route follows a well built footpath above the north side of the waterfall. Above the waterfall, the fast flowing Tail Burn must be crossed to avoid a long detour; although there are plenty of natural stepping stones, spate or icy conditions may make their use dangerous. From across the stream, the best route through the peat and heather follows the course of a wall leading to the summit of Upper Tarnberry. From there, the east ridge, which is steep and craggy in places, leads to the broad summit.

An alternative ascent, described by the Daily Telegraph as one of "Britain's finest half-day and day walks", follows the Tail Burn to the outlet of Loch Skeen before ascending the ridge to Mid Craig, and passing Donald's Cleuch Head to reach the summit. The descent suggested is via Rough Craig and south to join the road and walk back to the start point.

Subsidiary summits
The Database of British and Irish hills  lists 18 subsidiary summits of White Coomb.

References 
 The Corbetts and Other Scottish Hills, (SMC Guide) 

Marilyns of Scotland
Donald mountains
Mountains and hills of the Southern Uplands
Mountains and hills of Dumfries and Galloway
Corbetts
Highest points of historic Scottish counties